Christina Källberg (born 1 April 2000) is a Swedish table tennis player. She competed in the 2020 Summer Olympics.

References

External links
 

2000 births
Living people
Table tennis players at the 2020 Summer Olympics
Swedish female table tennis players
Olympic table tennis players of Sweden
21st-century Swedish women